Nian (also Romanized as Nīān; also known as Nīānqīlān) is a village in Vizhenan Rural District, in the Central District of Gilan-e Gharb County, Kermanshah Province, Iran. At the 2006 census, its population was 195, in 45 families.

References 

Populated places in Gilan-e Gharb County